Dolicrossea vesca is a species of minute sea snail in the family Elachisinidae.

Distribution
This marine species occurs off New Zealand.

References

 Powell A. W. B., New Zealand Mollusca, William Collins Publishers Ltd, Auckland, New Zealand 1979 
  Spencer H.G., Willan R.C., Marshall B.A. & Murray T.J. (2011) Checklist of the Recent Mollusca Recorded from the New Zealand Exclusive Economic Zone

Elachisinidae
Gastropods of New Zealand
Taxa named by Harold John Finlay